Arikun is a group of Austronesian indigenous Formosan people living from the western plain to central basin of Taiwan, especially. They have lived through the Dutch colonization of Taiwan, as well as the Manchurian occupation during the Qing Dynasty.

Arikun people along with Lloa people used to be classified as a subgroup of Hoanya people, but this concept has been rejected by some scholars, as the name "Hoanya" seems to be a derogatory exonym from huan-á (Southern Min: "the barbarians") by the Chinese immigrants.

Communities 
Some indigenous communities founded by Arikun in the 18th century include:

 Man Talack (萬斗六社) in nowadays Taichung, a community resided by both Arikun and Babuza.
 Kakar Barroroch (貓羅社) in nowadays Changhua.
 Tausa Mato (北投社) in nowadays Nantou.
 Tausa Talakey (南投社) in nowadays Nantou.

See also 
 Taiwanese indigenous peoples
 Hoanya people
 Lloa people

References 

Taiwanese indigenous peoples